Barrueta is a Basque surname. Notable people with the surname include:

Marilyn Barrueta (died 2010), American educator
Noé Barrueta (born 1971), Mexican politician
Norma Vasallo Barrueta, Cuban feminist researcher and academic

Basque-language surnames